Tyler Hill is an unincorporated community in Wayne County, Pennsylvania, United States. Tyler Hill has a post office with ZIP code 18469, which opened on January 14, 1878.

References

Unincorporated communities in Wayne County, Pennsylvania
Unincorporated communities in Pennsylvania